Hampton Hall in Franklin, Kentucky is a farm with an Early Classical Revival mansion built in 1838.  It has a two-story portico with four fluted Doric columns at its front entry.  An earlier log cabin is attached to the two-story house.

It was listed on the National Register of Historic Places in 1996.  The listing includes six contributing buildings, one additional contributing structure, and one contributing site, over a  area.

References

Farms on the National Register of Historic Places in Kentucky
Historic districts on the National Register of Historic Places in Kentucky
National Register of Historic Places in Simpson County, Kentucky
1838 establishments in Kentucky
Houses completed in 1838
Houses on the National Register of Historic Places in Kentucky
Houses in Simpson County, Kentucky